Cameron Shekleton (born 21 January 2000) is a South African cricketer. He made his first-class debut for Gauteng in the 2018–19 CSA 3-Day Provincial Cup on 7 February 2019. He made his List A debut for Gauteng in the 2018–19 CSA Provincial One-Day Challenge on 10 February 2019. In April 2021, he was named in KwaZulu-Natal Inland's squad, ahead of the 2021–22 cricket season in South Africa.

References

External links
 

2000 births
Living people
South African cricketers
Gauteng cricketers
Place of birth missing (living people)